Javier or Javi López may refer to:

Arturo López (Javier Arturo López, born 1983), Mexican-American baseball pitcher
Carlos Javier López (born 1980), Argentine footballer
Javier López (baseball) (born 1977), Puerto Rican-American baseball player
Javier López (general) (1792–1836), Argentine soldier and several times governor of Tucumán Province
Javier López (sport shooter) (born 1989), Spanish sports shooter
Francisco Javier López Díaz (theologian) (born 1949), Spanish theologian and a priest of the Catholic Church 
Javi López (footballer, born 1964) (Francisco Javier López Castro), Spanish retired footballer and manager
Javi López (footballer, born 1988) (Francisco Javier López Díaz), Spanish footballer
Javi López (footballer, born 2002) (Javier López Carballo), Spanish footballer
Javi López (footballer, born 1990) (Javier López Muñoz), Spanish footballer 
Javi López Fernández, Spanish member of the European Parliament
Javi López (footballer, born 1986) (Javier López Rodríguez, born 1986), Spanish footballer 
Javy López (Javier López Torres, born 1970), Puerto Rican former catcher in Major League Baseball
Javier López Vallejo (born 1975), retired Spanish footballer
Javier López Zavala (born 1969), Mexican politician

See also